Sean Banerjee is an Indian actor and model. He is known for playing the character of Dr. Ujaan Chatterjee in the romantic medical series Ekhane Aakash Neel and Mr. Rishi Sen in Mon Phagun.

Early life 
Sean Banerjee was born in Kolkata, West Bengal. in Kolkata. His mother is Shoma Chatterjee, a film scholar, and his father is Mrigen Banerjee. He is grandson of Supriya Devi, an actress. He has an elder brother named Neil Goswami. He studied in Sherwood College, Nainital until and graduated from Delhi College of Art.

Career 
Banerjee began his career in modeling. He debuted his career in 2018 on Indian television with Ami Sirajer Begum on Star Jalsha and acted as the male protagonist in the series Nawab Siraj ud-Daulah. Since July 2021, he had been last seen in Mon Phagun, a TV series aired on Star Jalsha.

Filmography

Films

Television

Awards 
West Bengal Tele Academy Awards

Calcutta Times Awards

References

Living people
Male actors from Kolkata
Bengali male television actors
1994 births
Indian male film actors
21st-century Indian male actors
Models from Kolkata
Indian male models
Indian male soap opera actors
Delhi University alumni